Conus cumingii, common name Cuming's cone, is a species of sea snail, a marine gastropod mollusk in the family Conidae, the cone snails and their allies.

Like all species within the genus Conus, these snails are predatory and venomous. They are capable of "stinging" humans, therefore live ones should be handled carefully or not at all.

This species is not to be confused with Conus cumingii Reeve, L.A., 1849, an invalid junior homonym and synonym of Conus virgatus Reeve, 1849 .

Description
The size of the shell varies between 20 mm and 40 mm.

Distribution
This marine species occurs off India, Sri Lanka, Western Thailand, Indonesia, the Southern Philippines and the Solomon Islands.

References

 Tucker J.K. & Tenorio M.J. (2009) Systematic classification of Recent and fossil conoidean gastropods. Hackenheim: Conchbooks. 296 pp. 
 Puillandre N., Duda T.F., Meyer C., Olivera B.M. & Bouchet P. (2015). One, four or 100 genera? A new classification of the cone snails. Journal of Molluscan Studies. 81: 1–23

External links

 The Conus Biodiversity website
 Cone Shells – Knights of the Sea
 

cumingii
Gastropods described in 1848